Major General Richard Gary Wilson, AO (born 16 January 1955) is a retired senior officer of the Australian Army. He served as Director of the Defence Intelligence Organisation from 2009 to 2011, and Chairman of the Queensland Reconstruction Authority in the wake of the 2010–11 Queensland floods.

Early life
Richard Gary Wilson was born in Brisbane, Queensland, on 16 January 1955.

Military career
A 1977 Infantry graduate of the Royal Military College, Duntroon, Wilson has extensive command experience in the Royal Australian Regiment.

He served as:
 (1978–1980) Platoon Commander in the 6th Battalion
 (1986) Adjutant, 2nd/4th Battalion
 (1987–88) Company Commander, 2nd/4th Battalion
 (1994) Commanding Officer, 2nd/4th Battalion
 (1995–96) Commanding Officer, 2nd Battalion
 (2002–03) Commander, 7th Brigade
 (2004) Director General Military Strategy
 (2005) Promoted to Major General and assumed the position of Commander, Training Command — Army.
 (2007) Commander 1st Division
 (2009) Director of the Defence Intelligence Organisation

He has held a wide range of staff appointments:
 (1981–82) Aide de Camp to the Chief of Defence Force Staff, Admiral Sir Anthony Synnot
 (1982) Operations Officer in the Army's Directorate of Operations
 (1989) Plans Officer (Land) on the Joint Exercise Planning Staff

Following Staff College, Wilson spent two years on exchange with the United States Army as an Operations Officer on the G3 staff of the 7th Infantry Division (Light), an element of the Rapid Deployment Force, based at Fort Ord in California.

In 1993, Wilson was seconded to the Office of National Assessments as a Defence Liaison Officer and Military Analyst. This was followed by an appointment as the Army representative on the Writing Team for the 1994 Defence White Paper 'Defending Australia'.

From August 1997 until January 2000, Wilson served as the first Chief Staff Officer Plans, or J5, at Headquarters Australian Theatre (HQAST), the Australian Defence Force's newly formed operational level headquarters. Of particular note during this period were the planning for the peace monitoring operations on Bougainville and the peace enforcement operations conducted in East Timor by an Australian-led international coalition force. For his services as the J5 at HQAST, Wilson was appointed a Member of the Order of Australia (AM) in the 2000 Australia Day Honours List.

Wilson served with the United Nations Transitional Administration in East Timor as Commander of the Peacekeeping Forces in Sector West from July 2001 until March 2002.  His overseas experience also includes two three-month tours of duty in Malaysia with Rifle Company Butterworth (1978 & 1988) and an exchange posting with the United States Army's 7th Infantry Division (Light) (1991–92) which included training deployments to Honduras, Panama and Colombia.

Wilson was responsible for "The Wilson Report" which examined C2 arrangements in the ADF and recommended the formation of a co-located Joint Headquarters. Located in NSW between Queanbeyan and Bungendore to the east of Canberra, this establishment is known as HQJOC(B).

On 6 July 2007, Wilson was appointed Commander, 1st Division. He was appointed an Officer in the Order of Australia in the Australia Day 2009 Honours List.

Wilson succeeded Major General Mick Slater as Chair of the Queensland Reconstruction Authority on 1 September 2011.

Qualifications
 1977 Graduate of the Royal Military College, Duntroon
 1977 Bachelor of Arts with First Class Honours from the University of New South Wales
 1983 Master of Letters from the University of New England
 1986 Doctor of Philosophy from the University of New South Wales. His doctoral thesis examined aspects of Australia's coastal surveillance regime.
 1990 Graduate of the Australian Army Command and Staff College, Fort Queenscliff
 2001 Graduate of the U.S. Army War College
 2001 Master of Strategic Studies from the U.S. Army War College

Personal
Richard Wilson and his wife have three children. He is keenly interested in sports, particularly rugby, enjoys reading military history and has a strong interest in environmental matters, strategic geography and international relations.

References

External links

Photo of MAJGEN Wilson. (Copyright). Caption: Maj-Gen Richard Wilson and Prof Marie Bashir, NSW Governor, cut the ribbon at the opening of the Sir Roden Cutler Display at the National Artillery Museum. Photo by AB Yuri Ramsey

1955 births
Military personnel from Brisbane
Australian generals
Graduates of the Joint Services Command and Staff College
Living people
Officers of the Order of Australia
People from Brisbane
Recipients of the Commendation for Distinguished Service
Royal Military College, Duntroon graduates
United States Army War College alumni
University of New South Wales alumni